The Wason Manufacturing Company was a maker of railway passenger coaches and streetcars during the 19th and early 20th century.  The company was founded in 1845 in Springfield, Massachusetts by Charles Wason (1816-1888) and Thomas Wason (1811-1870). Although the concept would later be popularized by the Pullman Company, Wason was the first to manufacture sleeping cars in America.

Wason's earliest clients included the Michigan Southern Railroad (1846–1855), Alton Railroad, Central Railroad of New Jersey, and Boston and Maine Railroad, as well as foreign operators such as the State Railway of Chile, and Egyptian National Railways, providing the latter with 161 cars as well as an ornate state carriage for Sa'id of Egypt, the viceroy at that time. By 1867 the company had about 300 employees.  The company made the first passenger coaches used on the Transcontinental railroad. One of these became the personal rail car of Leland Stanford, President of the Central Pacific Railroad. By 1868 the company had consolidated with the Springfield Machine Company, keeping the name Wason Manufacturing.

Around 1900 Wason concentrated on manufacturing streetcars and electrified railway cars. Clients included the Holyoke Street Railway Company and Manhattan Railway Company. The company became a subsidiary of J. G. Brill and Company in 1906. It continued to manufacture both streetcars and conventional railroad cars until 1932, when the Great Depression forced Brill to close the plant.

One of the only surviving examples of a Wason coach can be found at the California State Railroad Museum's Railtown facility in Jamestown, California, located in the Sierra foothills. Wason streetcars on display at museums include 13 streetcars, interurban cars, and rapid transit cars at the Seashore Trolley Museum in Kennebunkport, ME; an 1896 model at the Shelburne Falls Trolley Museum (Mass.) and a 1901 model at the Connecticut Trolley Museum.

Wason was a prominent manufacturer of trolley plows and street cleaning equipment. Philadelphia and Western #10 was the last street railway plow still in operation was it was preserved by the Rock Hill Trolley Museum in Pennsylvania.

See also
List of rolling stock manufacturers
Wason-Springfield Steam Power Blocks, historic site

References

Defunct rolling stock manufacturers of the United States
Manufacturing companies based in Springfield, Massachusetts
Manufacturing companies established in 1845
Vehicle manufacturing companies disestablished in 1932
1845 establishments in Massachusetts
1932 disestablishments in Massachusetts
1906 mergers and acquisitions
Defunct manufacturing companies based in Massachusetts
J. G. Brill Company